The CONCACAF Gold Cup is North America's major tournament in senior men's football and determines the continental champion. Until 1989, the tournament was known as CONCACAF Championship. It is currently held every two years. From 1996 to 2005, nations from other confederations have regularly joined the tournament as invitees. In earlier editions, the continental championship was held in different countries, but since the inception of the Gold Cup in 1991, the United States are constant hosts or co-hosts.

From 1973 to 1989, the tournament doubled as the confederation's World Cup qualification. CONCACAF's representative team at the FIFA Confederations Cup was decided by a play-off between the winners of the last two tournament editions in 2015 via the CONCACAF Cup, but was then discontinued along with the Confederations Cup. As Non-FIFA members, Martinique were not able to qualify for the Confederations Cup, even if they had won the tournament.

Since the inaugural tournament in 1963, the continental championship was held 26 times and has been won by seven different nations, most often by Mexico (11 titles).

The Martinican football federation has been an associate member of CONCACAF only since 1991, which enabled them to enter the qualification stage for the inaugural CONCACAF Gold Cup when the CONCACAF Championship was rebranded under that name. Since then, they have qualified for six tournaments, which puts them among the more successful Caribbean teams in tournament history. They qualified for the knockout stage once, in 2002, after a 1–0 victory against Trinidad and Tobago.

In their first tournament match in 1993, Martinique was on the receiving end of a 9–0 win for Mexico, still the highest victory in tournament history. Seven of those goals were scored by striker Zague, another unique record.

Overall record

Match overview

Record players

Top goalscorers

Kévin Parsemain, who captained the Martinique national team in 2013 and 2017, is the only Martiniquais player to score more than one goal at CONCACAF Gold Cups. In 2017, his three goals were enough to make him shared top-scorer of the tournament, although the Golden Boot award went to Canadian Alphonso Davies.

External links
CONCACAF official site
Soccerway database

References

Countries at the CONCACAF Gold Cup
Martinique national football team